The Megheswar Temple is a 12th-century Hindu temple dedicated to the deity Shiva. The temple is located at Tankapani road area in Bhubaneswar, India.

References

Hindu temples in Bhubaneswar
Shiva temples in Odisha
13th-century Hindu temples